Agalinis auriculata is a species of flowering plant in the family Orobanchaceae known as earleaf false foxglove, auriculate false foxglove, and earleaf gerardia. It is endemic to the United States, where it occurs from New Jersey west to Minnesota and throughout most southern states.

Description and ecology
The leaves are arranged oppositely on the stem, and the stems have retrorse-hispid hairs and auricled leaves. The purple, five-cleft flowers have two smaller upper lobes which are more united than the three lower ones. The flowers have purple-spotted throats and they bloom in July and September. Today this plant is considered to be vulnerable. Because of this research is being conducted by the Center of Biodiversity focusing on the genetic diversity and disturbances of the Agalinis auriculata to figure more about its distribution and habitats. 

The plant is hemiparasitic, meaning it contains chlorophyll to accomplish photosynthesis, but is also parasitic on other plants to obtain some nutrients. In cultivation the plant was able to parasitize Helianthus occidentalis (western sunflower) and Rudbeckia fulgida (showy black-eyed Susan) and it was observed to connect to a grass, possibly Poa compressa (Kentucky bluegrass), in the field.

Distribution and habitat
This plant has a wide geographical distribution and it was formerly more common than it is today. It appears to require soil disturbance for seed germination. In the past, this disturbance may have been caused by herds of bison. The plant can colonize mounds of earth that have been turned over by pocket gophers (Geomys bursarius).

There are 40 to 50 known occurrences today, mostly comprising small populations. The largest populations are in Arkansas, Missouri, and Mississippi.
It is an endangered species in Minnesota where historical records report that it was found growing in wet meadows in the lower Mississippi valley but much of its natural habitat has been destroyed especially around the Twin Cities.

References

auriculata
Endemic flora of the United States
Plants described in 1803